Derince railway station is a railway station in Hereke, Turkey. TCDD Taşımacılık operates four daily regional trains between Istanbul and Adapazarı that stop at the station. The station was originally built in 1904 by the Ottoman Anatolian Railway along with the Port of Derince.

Derince station was closed down on 1 February 2012 due to construction of the Ankara-Istanbul high-speed railway. The station was reopened on 4 August 2017.

References

External links
TCDD Taşımacılık

Railway stations in Kocaeli Province
Railway stations opened in 1904
1904 establishments in the Ottoman Empire